"Bo Weevil" is a song written by Dave Bartholomew and Fats Domino, recorded by Domino in 7 November 1955 and released as a single in January 1956, peaking at number 35 on the U.S. pop chart and number 5 on the U.S. R&B chart in February 1956. It was featured on his 1956 album, Rock and Rollin' with Fats Domino.

Alternate versions
In 1991, two new versions of the song performed by Fats Domino were released: the so-called "complete" (length 2:45), on the soundtrack of the film A Rage in Harlem, and the "alternative" (1:50), on the 4-CD box set "They Call Me The Fat Man...". The "complete" version was also included in the 1993 Fats Domino box set Out of New Orleans. However, these alternate versions are simply composite edits of the original recording, the shortest of the three (1:50), which was considered as alternative by Fats Domino fans. The first minute of this original recording (after a two-second intro) was repeated twice to produce a composite master for the single and album (2:02). The long so-called "complete" version is a triple repetition of the same first minute with a fade-out at the end.

Other versions
Teresa Brewer released a competing version in January 1956 as well,  and her version reached number 17 the U.S. pop chart in March 1956.  It was the B-side for her single, "A Tear Fell", which reached number 2 in the UK and number 5 in the U.S.
Bonnie Lou released a version of the song as a single in 1956, but it did not chart.
The Dixiebelles released a version of the song on their 1963 EP Down at Papa Joe's.

References

1955 songs
1956 singles
Songs written by Dave Bartholomew
Songs written by Fats Domino
Fats Domino songs
Teresa Brewer songs
Coral Records singles
Imperial Records singles
King Records (United States) singles